This article is about the composition of the Regional Council of Veneto, the legislative assembly of Veneto, during the X Legislature, thus the term started in June 2015, following the 2015 regional election, and ended in September 2020. Of the 51 members, 49 were elected in provincial constituencies by proportional representation using the largest remainder method with a Droop quota and open lists, while the remaining two were the elected President and the candidate for President who came second. The winning coalition won a bonus of seats in order to make sure the elected President had a majority in the Council.

Roberto Ciambetti (Liga Veneta–Lega Nord) was the President of the Council for the entire term, while Luca Zaia (Liga Veneta–Lega Nord) served as President of Veneto at the head of his second government.

Composition

Strength of political groups
Sources: Regional Council of Veneto – Groups and Regional Council of Veneto – Members

Members by party of election

Zaia for President
Fabiano Barbisan (switched to "Venetian Centre-Right" in May 2017, switched to the Mixed Group in February 2020)
Fabrizio Boron
Gianpaolo Bottacin
Sonia Brescacin
Francesco Calzavara
Nicola Finco (switched to "Liga Veneta–Lega Nord" in June 2015)
Nazzareno Gerolimetto
Manuela Lanzarin
Gabriele Michieletto
Silvia Rizzotto
Luciano Sandonà
Stefano Valdegamberi (switched to the "Mixed Group" in March 2017)
Alberto Villanova

Liga Veneta–Lega Nord
Riccardo Barbisan
Roberto Ciambetti
Luca Coletto (resigned on 7 January 2019)
Maurizio Colman (installed on 19 June 2018)
Enrico Corsi (installed on 15 January 2019)
Marino Finozzi (resigned on 15 June 2018)
Gianluca Forcolin
Franco Gidoni
Roberto Marcato
Alessandro Montagnoli
Gianpiero Possamai
Alberto Semenzato
Luca Zaia

Venetian Democratic Party
Graziano Azzalin
Anna Maria Bigon (installed on 5 July 2019)
Stefano Fracasso
Alessandra Moretti (resigned on 2 July 2019)
Bruno Pigozzo
Piero Ruzzante (switched to the "Mixed Group", as a member of Article One, in February 2017)
Orietta Salemi (switched to the "Mixed Group", as a member of Italia Viva, in July 2020)
Claudio Sinigaglia
Andrea Zanoni
Francesca Zottis

Five Star Movement
Erika Baldin
Patrizia Bartelle (switched to the "Mixed Group" in November 2018)
Jacopo Berti
Manuel Brusco
Simone Scarabel

Forza Italia
(In March 2019 the group, no longer affiliated to Forza Italia, was re-named "More Italy!–I Love Veneto".)
Massimiliano Barison (switched to "Brothers of Italy" in January 2018, switched to "United Venetians" in June 2019)
Elena Donazzan (left the party by mid 2018)
Massimo Giorgetti (left the party by mid 2018)

Tosi List for Veneto
(In July 2017 the group, no longer connected to the Tosi List for Veneto, was re-named "Veneto for Autonomy".)
Andrea Bassi (switched to "Venetian Centre-Right" in May 2017, switched o "Brothers of Italy" in February 2020)
Stefano Casali (switched to "Venetian Centre-Right" in May 2017, switched o "Brothers of Italy" in February 2020)
Maurizio Conte (member of Forza Italia since August 2017)

Moretti for President
(In July 2019 the group was re-named "Civic List for Veneto".)
Franco Ferrari
Cristina Guarda (switched to the "Mixed Group", as a member of the Federation of the Greens, in July 2020)

NCD–UdC–Popular Area
Marino Zorzato (member of Forza Italia since November 2018)

Independence We Veneto
(Since March 2016 the group was named "We Are Veneto" and since February 2020 "Party of Venetians".)
Antonio Guadagnini

Brothers of Italy
Sergio Berlato (resigned on 31 January 2020)
Joe Formaggio (installed on 21 February 2020)

Civic Veneto
(Since July 2018 the group was named "United Venetians".)
Pietro Dalla Libera

Veneto of Acting / Veneto Autonomous Heart
(Since December 2018 the group was named "Veneto Autonomous Heart".)
Giovanna Negro

Election

Luca Zaia of Liga Veneta–Lega Nord was re-elected President by a landslide 50.1% of the vote. Liga Veneta, which ran an official party list and a list named after Zaia, was confirmed the largest in the region with 40.9%. The Democratic Party came second with 20.5% (combined result of official party list and Alessandra Moretti's personal list) and the Five Star Movement third with 10.4%. The total score of Venetist parties was 54.3%, then a record.

References

Veneto,2015
Regional Council,2015
2015